Brucella daejeonensis is a gram-negative, nitrate-reducing aerobic, non-spore-forming, rod-shaped bacteria from the genus of Brucella which was isolated in Daejeon in South Korea.

References

External links
Type strain of Ochrobactrum daejeonense at BacDive -  the Bacterial Diversity Metadatabase

Hyphomicrobiales
Bacteria described in 2011